Bonnal is a village in the commune of Neunhausen, in North-Western Luxembourg.  , the village had a population of 30; it is the administrative centre of the commune of Neunhausen.

Villages in Luxembourg
Wiltz (canton)